The Michigan Five Fluke Freshmen is the name given to five members of the U.S. House of Representatives who were elected in the Democratic landslide of 1964 and were subsequently defeated just two years later by a Republican resurgence. They included Paul Todd, Raymond Clevenger, Billie Farnum, John Mackie, and Wes Vivian of the U.S. House of Representatives from Michigan. All of the five were one-term congressmen. It was the last time that a state would have five freshmen members of Congress defeated for reelection.

1964: LBJ landslide

With President Lyndon B. Johnson taking over 67% of the vote in Michigan, the Democrats were able to win five districts formerly represented by Republicans, and change the Michigan Congressional delegation from 12 to 7 Republican to 12 to 7 Democratic. Three of the defeated Republicans had significant seniority.  The Democratic gains took place in District 2 (based in the Ann Arbor area), District 3 (set around Kalamazoo and Battle Creek), District 7 (Flint and its surrounding region), District 11 (northern lower Michigan and the Upper Peninsula), and District 19 (suburban Detroit). Nationally Democrats gained 36 seats from the Republicans in the House.

1966: Republican Resurgence

Richard Nixon took an active interest in the 1966 midterm elections in Michigan, especially these five races. He personally persuaded Donald Riegle to leave academia and run against Mackie, and appeared at a fundraiser for Riegle's campaign early in the primary season. Nixon campaigned for the five Republican challengers during the whole campaign, and played them up to reporters. Political analyst Rhodes Cook wrote that "no politician had used the midterm election year more effectively than former Vice President Richard Nixon, who with his young aide-de camp, Pat Buchanan, took to the 'rubber chicken circuit' on behalf of Republican candidates across the country." None of the Democrats had run as strongly as Johnson in 1964, indicating their potential weakness.

The unpopularity of President Johnson's Great Society, rising crime, radical campus protests, and racial riots coupled with the coattail effect of popular Republican Governor George W. Romney at the top of the state ticket all led to a downturn for the Democratic Party. Growing dissatisfaction with the war in Vietnam was also a factor.

The Republicans succeeded in recapturing the five districts they lost in 1964 and returned the delegation to a 12 to 7 Republican majority. Nationally the Republicans gained 47 seats from the Democrats in the House.

In 1973, Riegle switched from the Republican Party to the Democratic Party, and went on to serve three terms in the United States Senate as a Democrat.

References

The Almanac of American Politics 1972

Democratic Party members of the United States House of Representatives from Michigan
1964 in Michigan
1964 in American politics
1966 in Michigan
1966 in American politics